Wen Yimei (born 1982-11-21 in Hangzhou, Zhejiang) is a female Chinese sports sailor who will compete for Team China at the 2008 Summer Olympics.

Major performances
2006 Asian Championships - 1st 470 class;
2006 National Championships Qingdao - 1st 470 class/470 class long distance race;
2006 National Championships Grand Finals - 1st 470 class;
2006 Asian Games - 3rd 470 class

References
 http://2008teamchina.olympic.cn/index.php/personview/personsen/831

1982 births
Living people
Chinese female sailors (sport)
Olympic sailors of China
Sportspeople from Hangzhou
Sailors at the 2008 Summer Olympics – 470
Asian Games medalists in sailing
Sailors at the 2006 Asian Games
Medalists at the 2006 Asian Games
Asian Games bronze medalists for China
21st-century Chinese women